The Turcu (also: Moieciu, in its upper course also: Bângăleasa or Grohotișul) is a right tributary of the river Bârsa in Romania. It discharges into the Bârsa in Tohanu Vechi near Zărnești. Its source is in the Bucegi Mountains.

Tributaries

The following rivers are tributaries to the river Turcu (from source to mouth):

Left: Stăncioiu, Grădiștea, Sbârcioara, Tohănița
Right: Valea Lungă, Jungulești, Șimon, Poarta

References

Rivers of Romania
Rivers of Brașov County